The women's VL3 competition at the 2016 ICF Paracanoe World Championships took place in Duisburg.

Schedule
The schedule was as follows:

All times are Central European Summer Time (UTC+2)

Results
With fewer than ten competitors entered, this event was held as a direct final.

References

ICF
ICF